This is a list of defunct airlines of Madagascar.

See also

 List of airlines of Madagascar
 List of airports in Madagascar

References

Madagascar
Airlines, defunct
Airlines